The Sir Edmund Whittaker Memorial Prize is awarded every four years by the Edinburgh Mathematical Society to an outstanding young mathematician having a specified connection with Scotland. It is named after Sir Edmund Whittaker.

History
After the death of Sir Edmund Whittaker in 1956, his son John Macnaghten Whittaker donated on behalf of the Whittaker Family the sum of £500 to the Edinburgh Mathematical Society to establish a prize for mathematical work in memory of his father. As of 2009, the award money remains £500.

Winners
2017 Arend Bayer (University of Edinburgh)
2013 Stuart White (University of Glasgow) 
2009 Agata Smoktunowicz (University of Edinburgh)
2005 Tom Bridgeland (University of Sheffield)
2001 Michael McQuillan and J A Sherratt
1997 Alan D Rendall (Max-Planck-Institut für Gravitationsphysik)
1993 Mitchell A. Berger and Alan W. Reid
1989 A A Lacey and Michael Röckner
1985 John Mackintosh Howie
1981 John M. Ball (University of Oxford)
1977 Gavin Brown and C A Stuart
1973 A M Davie (University of Edinburgh)
1970 Derek J S Robinson (University of Illinois)
1965 John Bryce McLeod (University of Oxford)
1961 A G Mackie and Andrew H. Wallace

See also

 List of mathematics awards

References

External links 
 O'Connor, John J.; Robertson, Edmund F., "EMS Whittaker Prize", MacTutor History of Mathematics archive, University of St Andrews
 O'Connor, John J.; Robertson, Edmund F., "Winners of the EMS Whittaker Prize", MacTutor History of Mathematics archive, University of St Andrews
 
 

Mathematics awards
Monuments and memorials in Scotland
Scottish awards
 
Memorial Prize